State Route 214 (SR 214) is a primary state highway in the U.S. state of Virginia. Known as Stratford Hall Road, the state highway runs  from SR 3 at Lerty northeast to SR 609 near Bryant Town in northern Westmoreland County. SR 214 provides access to Stratford Hall, the birthplace of Robert E. Lee.

SR 214 is a Virginia Byway.

Route description

SR 214 begins at an intersection with SR 3 (Kings Highway) at Lerty. The state highway heads east and passes to the south of the Stratford Hall property, which is accessed by Great House Road. At SR 644 (Wild Sally Road), SR 214 veers northeast and reaches its eastern terminus at an arbitrary point east of Stratford Hall. Stratford Hall Road continues northeast as SR 609 through the hamlet of Bryant Town.

Major intersections

References

External links

Virginia Highways Project: VA 214

214
State Route 214
214